Maurice Françon (15 June 1913 – 11 August 1996) was a French engineer and physicist.

Biography 

His father was related to the Edouard Herriot's family and worked as an Chemical Engineer at the Physical Research Laboratory of the Sorbonne managed by Gabriel Lippmann, then founded an automobile company.

Maurice Françon graduated with a "licence ès sciences physiques" from the Faculté des Sciences de Paris. In 1937, he enters in SupOptique en graduate as an Engineer a year later. During the World War Two, he fought in the North and went briefly to England.

He got hired at the SupOptique's Laboratory which moved at Saint-Cyr-sur-Mer. His studies were mainly related to physiological optics. After the invasion in the free zone, Maurice Françon came back to the Boulevard Pasteur and began to write a thesis titled Vision in an instrument tainted with spherical aberration (in french: Vision dans un instrument entaché d'aberration sphérique) under the supervision of Pierre Fleury that he submit in 1945 at the Sorbonne before a jury chaired by Charles Fabry. He became the head of the Science faculty's work and in charge of practical work at the Institut d'optique Graduate School with André Maréchal.

Maurice Françon is buried in the MontParnasse's cemetery in Paris.

1913 births
1996 deaths
20th-century French engineers
20th-century French physicists
Optical physicists